63 Ophiuchi is an O-type giant star in the constellation Sagittarius, despite its name. During a 2009 survey for companions of massive stars, it was observed using speckle interferometry but no companion was found. The small parallax measurement of  suggest that this extremely luminous star may be located about 3,600 light-years away. The star lies only 0.3° north of the galactic plane.

In 1983, astronomers from the Sternberg Astronomical Institute in Moscow, Russia identified a faint, shell-shaped nebula surrounding the star that was being excited by the star's energy. Named Sharpless 22, this ring-shaped nebula has a double-shell structure with an inner envelope spanning 45–50′ (9–18 pc), surrounded by a diffuse envelope some 65–80′ (14–29 pc) across.

References

O-type bright giants
Emission-line stars

Sagittarius (constellation)
Durchmusterung objects
Ophiuchi, 63
162978
087706
6672